Isai Scheinberg (born 1946 or 1947) is the Lithuanian Jewish founder of the PokerStars online poker site.  Scheinberg previously had been a senior programmer for IBM Canada.

Biography
In about 1986, Scheinberg left Israel, and moved to Toronto. They settled there in Richmond Hill, where in 2011 he still owned the house he had bought in 1988.

In 2011, Scheinberg was indicted on five criminal charges related to Pokerstars under United States federal laws.  In September 2020, he was sentenced to pay a fine of $30,000 with no jail time.

Scheinberg sold his stake in Pokerstars to Amaya Gaming in 2014 for $4.9 billion.

Well known for his sense of personal privacy, he gave his first ever media interview to Lance Bradley in 2021.

See also
United States v. Scheinberg

References

PokerStars
Businesspeople from Ontario
Businesspeople in software
Living people
People from Richmond Hill, Ontario
1940s births
Israeli businesspeople
Israeli emigrants to Canada
Israeli Jews
Canadian Jews
Poker people